Regente Feijó is a municipality in the state of São Paulo in Brazil. The population is 20,394 (2020 est.) in an area of 263 km². The elevation is 504 m.

References

Municipalities in São Paulo (state)